Philip Martin Brown (born 9 July 1956) is a British actor from Manchester. He is known for his long-running portrayal of English teacher Grantly Budgen in the hit BBC One school-based drama series Waterloo Road, which he played from 2006 to 2013. He is also known for playing Steve McDonald's (Simon Gregson) Therapist in the ITV soap opera Coronation Street in 2015, although he first appeared in the show as D.I. Pinnock in 2005. In 2021, Brown appeared in the BBC One medical soap opera Doctors as Marvin Bulis, having previously played various other roles in the show.

Career
From March 2006 to October 2013, Brown appeared as English teacher Grantly Budgen in the first nine series of the BBC One school-based drama series Waterloo Road. He was the longest serving cast member on the show and featured in 154 episodes in total. He has also worked on The Professionals, Cutting It and The Bill, where he appeared in ten episodes as Seth Mercer, and has made appearances in many other British dramas, including Heartbeat, Midsomer Murders, Hetty Wainthropp Investigates, New Tricks and Doctors. 

His most prominent role in a drama before Waterloo Road was Eddie Vincent in Casualty, where he appeared in 17 episodes between 2002 and 2003. He also played John Adams in the 1984 film The Bounty and appeared in Sharpes Justice in 1997. He played a detective in the second episode of the ITV drama Rosemary & Thyme. He also appeared in a Skins online episode in 2012 as a drug dealer. Brown left Waterloo Road during the autumn term of Series 9. He appeared briefly in the 1999 film Sleepy Hollow starring Johnny Depp. In January 2015, he appeared in Coronation Street as Steve McDonald's (Simon Gregson) therapist. He appeared in the CBBC series The Worst Witch in 2017, playing the role of Algernon Rowan-Webb.

Filmography

Film

Television

Personal life and awards
He attended Barrow-in-Furness Grammar School for Boys where his favourite subject was English. At the end of his fifth year, Brown was asked to leave the school, later stating that he was a "dreadful troublemaker". He lives in Paddock Wood, Kent, with his wife. They have two children.

In 2010, Brown was nominated for the Best Actor prize in the 2010 TV Choice Awards, and won it three years in a row.

He is an ex-epileptic and had to leave the stage until he underwent brain surgery which has left him seizure-free for 22 years.

Brown was diagnosed with epilepsy at the age of 19 and is now an ambassador for the charity Young Epilepsy.

References

External links

1956 births
Living people
English male stage actors
English male television actors
English male film actors
People educated at Barrow-in-Furness Grammar School for Boys
People with epilepsy
Male actors from Manchester
20th-century English male actors
21st-century English male actors